In probability theory and statistics, a Hawkes process, named after Alan G. Hawkes, is a kind of self-exciting point process. It has arrivals at times  where the infinitesimal probability of an arrival during the time interval  is

 

The function  is the intensity of an underlying Poisson process.

Thus viewing some arrivals as descendants of earlier arrivals, we have a Galton–Watson branching process. The number of such descendants is finite with probability 1 if branching ratio is 1 or less. If the branching ratio is more than 1, then each arrival has positive probability of having infinitely many descendants.

Applications 
Hawkes processes are used for statistical modeling of events in mathematical finance, epidemiology, and other fields in which a random event exhibits self-exciting behavior.

See also 

 Point process
 Self-oscillation

References

Further reading 
 
 

Stochastic processes
Point processes
Mathematical finance